Marcelo Capalbo (born 23 September 1970) is an Uruguayan basketball coach and former player, born in Montevideo.

References

1970 births
Living people
Sportspeople from Montevideo
Uruguayan men's basketball players
Basketball players at the 1991 Pan American Games
Basketball players at the 1995 Pan American Games
Pan American Games competitors for Uruguay
Place of birth missing (living people)